The Betrayed Tour was a concert tour by alternative rock band Lostprophets, taking place in 2010, in support of their fourth studio album The Betrayed.

The tour began on 18 January 2010, with three special dates in London, Cardiff and Birmingham, as well as a festival appearance at the Outside-In Festival in Newcastle upon Tyne. The official UK tour began on 4 February 2010 and lasted until 28 February 2010, with support act Kids in Glass Houses on all dates, with a changing slot support from Hexes (4–13 February), We Are the Ocean (14–15 February) and Sharks (17 February – 1 March). The Port Talbot 1 March 2010 date was cancelled due to a fire in Afan Lido which caused damage to the venue. The date was rescheduled to 1 May 2010, at the Cardiff International Arena in Cardiff, Wales, with the same support acts.

The band then headlined a short tour of Australia and Japan, with The Blackout supporting on all dates. The Blackout also supported the band on their second European leg which took the bands to such countries as the Netherlands, Germany, Belgium, France and more, with some additional UK & Irish dates, and two Russian dates supported by Those Days. The end of the tour saw the band performing at the Reading and Leeds Festivals, with some additional UK & Scottish dates, with supporting acts Attack! Attack! and Young Guns.

No US dates were played during the tour in support of the album, as the album wasn't even released in the US.

Set list

Tour dates

Support acts

Attack! Attack! (21 May 2010; 24–25 August 2010)
Foxy Shazam (25 August 2010)
Hexes (4–13 February, 1 May 2010)
Jody Has A Hitlist (18–19 May 2010)
Kids in Glass Houses (4–28 February, 1 May 2010)
Sharks (17–28 February, 1 May 2010)
Stornoway (2 May 2010)
The Blackout (27–30 March, 6–30 April, 2 May 2010)

The Dead Formats (21 May 2010)
The Maple Room (12 April 2010)
Those Days (24–25 May 2010)
Tonight Alive (27–30 March 2010)
We Are Scientists (2 May 2010)
We Are the Ocean (14–15 February 2010)
Young Guns (23 August 2010)

Personnel
Ian Watkins – lead vocals
Lee Gaze – lead guitar, backing vocals
Mike Lewis – rhythm guitar, backing vocals
Stuart Richardson – bass, backing vocals
Jamie Oliver – synth, turntables, samples, vocals
Luke Johnson – drums, backing vocals

References

2010 concert tours